Sobaka magazine was an avant-garde periodical that examined and reviewed events in Third World countries but usually did not get the attention of the mainline press. Countries covered included Haiti, Asian successor states of the Soviet Union and Caucasian and Middle Eastern states. Its editors were Cali Ruchala and Mark Irkali, issuing the magazine as Diacritica Press. Seventeen issues of the periodical were published during 1998–2006.

References

1998 establishments in Russia
2006 disestablishments in Russia
Avant-garde magazines
Defunct magazines published in Russia
Defunct political magazines
Magazines established in 1998
Magazines disestablished in 2006
Political magazines published in Russia
Russian-language magazines